Jaume Comas Font (born August 2, 1974, in Premià de Mar, Spain) is a retired Spanish professional basketball player.

Player profile
At a height of 1.86 m height, Comas was an explosive point guard, with a good 3 point shot, and good passing ability. He was also good at getting steals. He played five seasons in the top division Spanish ACB League, and spent the rest of his career in the second division Spanish LEB League.

Spain national team
As a member of the senior Spain men's national basketball team, Comas played at the 2004 Summer Olympics.

Teams
1992-93  Joventut Badalona (youth team)
1993-94  Premià
1994-95  Mataró
1995-97  Pineda
1997-98  Melilla
1998-99  Badajoz
1999-00  Lleida Bàsquet
1999-00  Cantabria Lobos
2000-08  Lleida Bàsquet
2008-09  Sant Josep
2009-11  Prat

Honors
Lleida Bàsquet

Spanish Second Division Champion: 1
2001
ACB Catalan Cup Champion: 2
2002, 2003
LEB Catalan Cup Champion: 1
2007

External links
FIBA Profile
Spanish League Profile 

1974 births
Living people
Basketball players from Catalonia
CB Girona players
CB Prat players
Liga ACB players
Melilla Baloncesto players
Spanish men's basketball players
Spanish men's 3x3 basketball players
Point guards